Só ("Alone"), published in Paris in 1892, is a collection of poems by the Portuguese poet António Nobre. It is the only work of his that appeared in his lifetime, and a classic of Portuguese literature.

Portuguese poetry collections
1892 books